Mohan Singh Mehta (1895-1986) was founder of Vidya Bhavan group of institutions and Seva Mandir in Udaipur, Rajasthan, India.

Life 
Mohan Singh Mehta was born in Bhilwara, Rajasthan, on 20 April 1895 to Jeewan Singh Mehta. His wife’s name was Hulas Kumari Mehta and he had one son, Jagat Singh Mehta, who became Foreign Secretary in the Government of India.

Mehta held a B.A. degree from Agra College, Agra (1916), an M.A. (Economics) from Allahabad University (1918), and both L.L.B. (1919) and Ph.D. degrees awarded by the London School of Economics (1927). He was admitted as a Barrister-at-Law by the Middle Temple in 1927.

Lecturer, Agra College, Agra – 1918-19. Government College, Ajmer – 1919-20, Headquarters Commissioner, Seva Samiti Boy Scout Association, 1920-22.

Revenue Officer, Mewar State Administration – 1922-28; Chief Revenue Officer 1928-36; Chief Minister, Banswara State 1937-40; Revenue and Education Minister, Mewar – 1940-44; Chief Minister, Banswara State 1944-46; Finance and Education Minister, Mewar 1946-48; Member, Constituent Assembly of India 1946-47.

Ambassador of India in Netherlands (1949–51); High Commissioner of India in Pakistan (1951–55); Ambassador of India in Switzerland, Austria and Vatican (1955–58); Member, Indian Delegation, UN General Assembly (1959).
Vice Chancellor, Rajasthan University (1960–66).

Non-Official International Conferences:
II World Congress on Settlements, Paris (1926); International Conference of World Student Christian Movement in Yugoslavia (1926); National Conference on Education of Canada (1962).

Other work 
Social and Educational Institutions Established:
Founder President of Vidya Bhawan – a progressive co-education complex; Founder  President of Seva Mandir, a Centre for Social Service and Rural Development.

Association with Seva Mandir
During the pre-independence period from 1900 to 1947, Udaipur was witness to an increasing awareness among educationists and liberal thinkers of the particular backwardness and political stagnation of Rajasthan. This provoked a movement towards change and inspired certain individuals, who had imbibed the concept of voluntarism, to seize the initiative. The late Dr. Mohan Sinha Mehta, founder of Seva Mandir, a social worker and an educationist, was one such individual. Dr. Mehta conceived of Seva Mandir in the twenties itself but activated it only in the late sixties when he returned to Udaipur after a long career including a decade as India’s Ambassador and six years as Vice Chancellor of the Rajasthan University. He was influenced by the national movement, especially by Madan Mohan Malviya and Dr. H.N. Kunzru, and attracted by the Servants of India Society. During his working life, he had been a sort of guide to social and educational activism in Mewar. Even as he served as Revenue Officer and later as Education Minister in Mewar State, and in between, as Diwan in Banswara, his abiding interest was in issues of citizenship. He made a start by establishing the Seva Samiti Boy Scout Troop, from where originated the idea of starting Vidya Bhawan School in 1931. At the school, the ideals of character formation, social obligation and a sensitivity to nature and the rural surroundings were focused upon, a spirit of adventure was inculcated and a sense of determination was stimulated to make youth responsible citizens. To Dr Mehta, Seva Mandir was an extension of these very concerns and the ideas of citizenship into the arena of rural development. This organization now has turned into a museum of social work in India.

Publications 
Mehta wrote Lord Hastings and the Indian States, published in 1929.

Recognition 
Award and titles for distinguished service to Mewar State Government (1940 and 1945); National Award Padma Vibhushan (1969); William Trolley Award Syracuse University, U.S. (1969); Award of Indian National Federation of UNESCO Associations (1979); Special Award of the Asian and South Pacific Bureau of Adult Education (1972); G.D. Parikh Memorial Award (1980); Honoured by the Indian University Association for Continuing Education, New Delhi (1985).

Doctor of Literature (Honoris Causa), University of Udaipur (1976); Doctor of Literature (Honoris Causa) University of Rajasthan (1982).

References

External links 
 
 

Recipients of the Padma Vibhushan in civil service
Alumni of the London School of Economics
Academic staff of the University of Rajasthan
High Commissioners of India to Pakistan
Members of the Constituent Assembly of India
People from Udaipur
1895 births
1986 deaths
20th-century Indian educational theorists
Ambassadors of India to the Netherlands
Ambassadors of India to the Holy See